Barry Cohen may refer to:
 Barry Cohen (politician), Australian politician
 Barry Cohen (attorney), American attorney in Florida
 Barry Marc Cohen, American art therapist
 Barry Crane, né Barry Cohen, television producer and director, and bridge player